Federal elections were held in Switzerland on 29 October 1922. The Free Democratic Party remained the largest party in the National Council, winning 60 of the 198 seats.

Results

National Council

By constituency

Council of States

Summary 
In several cantons the members of the Council of States were chosen by the cantonal parliaments.

By canton

References

Switzerland
1922 in Switzerland
Federal elections in Switzerland
October 1922 events
Federal